Berkshire Hathaway Energy (previously known as MidAmerican Energy Holdings Company until 2014) is a holding company that is 92% owned by Berkshire Hathaway. Berkshire has owned a controlling stake since 1999. The company also controls power distribution companies in the United Kingdom and Canada.

Greg Abel serves as president, chairman and CEO. David L. Sokol was CEO until 2008.

Until 2014, it was known as MidAmerican Energy Holdings Company from its root as MidAmerican Energy Company; it took on the name of its parent to reflect the diversity of its portfolio.

As of 2019, BHE "serves 4.9 million retail customers, generates 29 gigawatts of power and transports 8.2 billion cubic feet of natural gas per day over 16,400 miles of regulated pipeline."

Subsidiaries & investments
Berkshire Hathaway Energy owns the following companies:
MidAmerican Energy Company
MidAmerican Renewables (Renewable Energy/Wind Energy)
PacifiCorp, purchased for $9.4 billion in 2005
Northern Powergrid (formerly CE Electric UK)
Integrated Utility Services UK
CalEnergy Generation, 350 MW geothermal power plants
Kern River Gas Transmission Company
Kern River Pipeline
Northern Natural Gas Company (Omaha) 
BYD Company (19,92% of outstanding shares)
NV Energy (electricity and natural gas in most of Nevada)
Metalogic Inspections Services (Oil and Gas, Power Generation, Fabrication, Pipeline, Services)
Intelligent Energy Solutions (Heat Pumps, Solar Panels, and Biomass Boilers)
AltaLink (Electric Utility in Canada) for C$3.24 billion in 2014 

In 2017, BHE's proposed acquisition of Oncor Electric Delivery Company LLC was terminated after BHE was outbid by Sempra.
BHE investigates producing up to 90 thousand tonnes of lithium carbonate per year (and other minerals) from its 350 MW geothermal power plants in California (Salton Sea).

References

External links

Berkshire Hathaway
Companies formerly listed on the London Stock Exchange
Companies based in Des Moines, Iowa
Natural gas pipeline companies
Solar energy companies of the United States
Electric power companies of the United Kingdom
Oil companies of the United States
Oil and gas companies of the United Kingdom
Utilities of England
Utilities of Canada